Pectis glaucescens, the sanddune cinchweed, is a summer blooming annual plant of the genus Pectis. it is native to Florida, Hispaniola, Jamaica and the Bahamas.

Pectis glaucescens is a freely-branching annual weed with opposing leaves in narrow rows. Leaves contain rows of oil glands on the lower surface. It has long-stalked yellow flowers with two to five small-scale fruits.

References

glaucescens
Flora of Florida
Flora of the Bahamas
Flora of Haiti
Flora of the Dominican Republic
Flora of Jamaica
Flora without expected TNC conservation status